Syed Babar Ashraf is an Indian Sufi leader.

Activism
During the pre-election period in India, Ashraf exhorted Muslims to vote those candidates "who are secular and have a clean image irrespective of their party affiliations." He denounced any move that was detrimental to the national good of the country. He has always been a strong critic of Wahhabism, Salafism, and associated ideologies. He has been promoting a Dargah Act to manage dargahs of Sufi saints according to Sufi traditions. Many Muslim heritage sites under Archaeological Survey of India  belong to Sufi Muslims that have now been usurped. Ashraf is against such usurpation.

References

External links
 

Aligarh Muslim University alumni
Indian Sufis
Living people
People from Ambedkar Nagar district
Indian Sufi religious leaders
Year of birth missing (living people)